Charles Robert Forder (6 January 1907 – 10 October 2008) was Archdeacon of York from 1957 to 1972.

Forder was educated at Paston Grammar School, Christ's College, Cambridge and Ridley Hall, Cambridge and ordained in 1930.  After  curacies in Hunslet and Burley he held Incumbencies in Wibsey, Bradford, Drypool, Routh, Wawne and Micklegate.

Notes

Archdeacons of York
Alumni of Christ's College, Cambridge
2008 deaths
1907 births
People educated at Paston College
People from Norfolk
British centenarians
Men centenarians